Depressaria atrostrigella is a moth in the family Depressariidae. It was described by John Frederick Gates Clarke in 1941. It is found in North America, where it has been recorded from south-western Manitoba and Colorado.

The wingspan is 21–24 mm. The forewings are ocherous white, strongly suffused with deep gray. The inner angle, veins, a longitudinal dash in the cell and a series of spots around the termen are all blackish fuscous. The hindwings are pale smoky gray.

References

Moths described in 1941
Depressaria
Moths of North America